The 2019 Big Ten women's basketball tournament was a postseason tournament that was held from March 6–10, 2019 at Bankers Life Fieldhouse in Indianapolis. Iowa won the tournament championship game over Maryland, 90–76.

Seeds
All 14 Big Ten schools are participating in the tournament. Teams will be seeded by 2018–19 Big Ten Conference season record. The top 10 teams receive a first-round bye and the top 4 teams receive a double bye.

Seeding for the tournament will be determined at the close of the regular conference season:

Schedule

*Game times in Eastern Time. #Rankings denote tournament seeding.

Bracket
 All times are Eastern.

* denotes overtime period

See also

 2019 Big Ten Conference men's basketball tournament

References

Big Ten women's basketball tournament
Tournament
Big Ten women's basketball tournament
Big Ten women's basketball tournament
Big Ten
College basketball tournaments in Indiana
Women's sports in Indiana